Francesca Pattaro (born 12 March 1995) is an Italian road and track cyclist, who most recently rode for UCI Women's Continental Team . She rode in the women's team pursuit event at the 2016 Summer Olympics.

Major results
2014
3rd  Team Pursuit, UEC European Under-23 Track Championships (with Beatrice Bartelloni, Elena Cecchini and Maria Giulia Confalonieri)
2016
2nd  Team Pursuit, UEC European Under-23 Track Championships (with Martina Alzini, Claudia Cretti and Michela Maltese)
2017
1st  Team Pursuit, Round 1, (Pruszków) Track Cycling World Cup (with Tatiana Guderzo, Elisa Balsamo and Silvia Valsecchi)

References

External links
 
 
 
 

1995 births
Living people
Italian female cyclists
Cyclists from the Province of Padua
Cyclists at the 2016 Summer Olympics
Olympic cyclists of Italy